Robert Frank Hoffmeyer (born July 27, 1955) is a Canadian former professional ice hockey player. He played in the National Hockey League (NHL) for the Chicago Black Hawks, Philadelphia Flyers, and New Jersey Devils.

External links
 

1955 births
Living people
Albany River Rats players
Canadian ice hockey defencemen
Chicago Blackhawks draft picks
Chicago Blackhawks players
Dallas Black Hawks players
Flint Generals players
Ice hockey people from Saskatchewan
Maine Mariners players
Minnesota Fighting Saints draft picks
New Brunswick Hawks players
New Jersey Devils coaches
New Jersey Devils players
New Jersey Devils scouts
Philadelphia Flyers players
Prince Albert Raiders players
Saskatoon Blades players
Canadian ice hockey coaches